Swargadwara is a cremation ground and one of India's most auspicious mortuary sites. It is located at on the shore of Bay of Bengal (called Mahodadhi), about a mile to the south of Jagannath Temple and southeastern area of the city Puri in Odisha. Where anyone can watch the cremations from a respectful distance. Generally the Hindus believe that, by cremated in Swargadwara, they will go to heaven for liberating their soul and will attain ultimate salvation.

History
Kapila Samhita mentioned that the Swargadwara one of a seven sacred places from the list, where Brahma was embodied from Heaven on earth with Indradyumna for consecrating the holy Trinity.
According to scriptures, the Daru Brahma (Soul stuff), from which the three main deities of the Jagannath temple are carved out, floated to the beach at Swargadwara.In every Amavasya Lord Jagannath in visiting sea which is said to be the in-law house of the Lord, through this holy cremation ground. On this holy site situated the temple of Goddess Smasana Kali. Goddess Kali act as the guard of Swargadwar and stand as the proof for all Heaven going Soul.

References 

Cremation
Hindu holy cities
Holy cities
Jagannath Temple Complex
Puri
Crematoria in India